Beneteau Figaro 2 is a French sailboat designed by Marc Lombard and built by Beneteau. It is the second generation of the original Figaro design, replacing the Bénéteau Figaro which was designed by Groupe Finot. It was launched in 2003 with 96 boats produced. In 2016 it was replaced by the Figaro 3.

See also 
 Solitaire du Figaro

References

External links 
Figaro 2 on boat specs

Keelboats
Sailboat types built by Beneteau
Sailing yachts designed by Marc Lombard
2000s sailboat type designs
Beneteau